
Jesse Hawley (May 11, 1773 – January 10, 1842) was an American flour merchant in Geneva, New York, who became an early and major proponent of building of the Erie Canal.

Biography
Hawley was born and raised in Bridgeport, Connecticut, to Elijah and Mercy Hawley. As an adult, he became a flour merchant in western New York. He collected wheat in Geneva and had it milled in Seneca Falls. Hawley's investments were based on the hopes that the General Schuyler's Western Inland Lock Navigation Company would continue its river improvements to Seneca Falls, which would reduce Hawley's costs of shipping the flour to the cities on the Atlantic. Unfortunately for Hawley, the Western Company halted progress on continued improvements to the rivers after Schuyler's death in 1804. Struggling to receive shipments and make deliveries over the wretched roadways of the era, Hawley imagined the canal as early as 1805.

Eventually, in 1807, Hawley's difficulties in securing reasonably priced transportation drove him in 1806 to debtors' prison for twenty months. While in prison, writing under the name "Hercules", he published fourteen essays on the idea of the canal from the Hudson River to Lake Erie; they appeared in the Genesee Messenger.

Considering his modest education and lack of formal training as an engineer or surveyor, Hawley's writing was remarkable; he pulled together a wealth of information necessary to the project, provided detailed analysis of the problems to be solved, and wrote with great eloquence and foresight on the importance the canal would have to the state and to the nation. Though they were deemed the ravings of a madman by some, Hawley's essays were proven to be immensely influential on the development of the canal.

Although Hawley's writing inspired others, such as Joseph Endicott and DeWitt Clinton, to pass laws construct what later became the Erie Canal, Hawley continued as a struggling merchant. His assets were apportioned in 1812.

In 1817, Hawley was appointed collector of revenue for the port of Genesee. Hawley was a member of the New York State Assembly, representing Genesee County in the 1820–21 session. He took part in the celebrations of the completion of the Erie Canal in 1825, representing the people of the city of Rochester.

His continued interest in the Erie Canal is evidenced in an 1840 essay, An Essay on the Enlargement of the Erie Canal.

He was buried at the Cold Springs Cemetery in Lockport, New York.

Personal life
Hawley married Elizabeth "Betsey" Ralston Tiffany, a young widow, in Canandaigua in May 1812. They had a daughter, Julia, who survived her father by six months. After their divorce, Hawley married Elizabeth L. Hawley.

References

External links
Hawley's Essays
Memoir of De Witt Clinton: With an Appendix, Containing Numerous Documents p.306 et seq. (Some Hawley correspondence also, just before the essays.)
An Essay on the Enlargement of the Erie Canal
John Rutherford, 1760-1840, Facts and observations in relation to the origin and completion of the Erie Canal

Erie Canal
Members of the New York State Assembly
1773 births
1842 deaths
Businesspeople from Rochester, New York
Politicians from Bridgeport, Connecticut
People imprisoned for debt
Politicians from Rochester, New York
Businesspeople from Bridgeport, Connecticut